Abdul Sattar Khan (born 5 June 1975) is Pakistani politician hailing from Kohistan District. He served as member of the Khyber Pakhtunkhwa Assembly from 2013 to 2018. He belongs to the Pakistan Muslim League (N).

References

1975 births
Living people
Pashtun people
Khyber Pakhtunkhwa MPAs 2013–2018
People from Kohistan District
Pakistan Muslim League (N) politicians